Ansano di Andrea di Bartolo (1421–1491) was an Italian painter active in Siena. After a brief spell in the late 1430s in Castiglione Olona (near Milan), as an assistant in Masolino’s workshop, he returned to Siena, where in the 1440s he quickly established him- self as one of the most progressive artists in the city. This was a time when the Renaissance avant-garde of Sienese painters, headed by Domenico di Bartolo and Lorenzo Vecchietta, were eagerly assimilating the innovations of the leading Florentine artists of the early Renaissance. Following in the footsteps of the leading Florentine painters and sculptors – Masaccio, Masolino, Filippo Lippi, Lorenzo Ghiberti and Donatello – they reformed the traditional formulas of Sienese painting without breaking with their own well-established traditions. These artists permeated their old Sienese formulas and inventions with a Renaissance spirit and produced pictures of major physical substance, consequently scenes of higher empathy, and, in the case of the splendid frescoes of the Pellegrinaio of the Ospedale di Santa Maria della Scala in Siena, episodes embedded in fantastic architectural settings, constructed as eccentric expressions of the newly acquired rules of perspective within an artistic vocabulary of no lesser eccentricity inspired by the classical world.

References
For the biographical data of Ansano di Andrea di Bartolo, cf. E. Romagnoli, Biografia cronologica de’ Bellartisti senesi dal secolo XII a tutto il XVIII, ca. 1835 (ed. Florence 1976), IV, pp. 495-502; V. Lusini, Il Duomo di Siena, II, Siena 1939, passim. For a recent discussion of Ansano di Andrea di Bartolo’s activity as a beater of gold, cf. W. Loseries, Bartolo di Fredi riabilitato, ‘La Diana’, II, 1996, pp. 463–464, who rightly (and in contrast to my previous opinion) recognizes an identity of Ansano di Andrea di Bartolo the painter and Ansano di Bartolo the gold-beater (i.e. a craftsman responsible for prepar- ing gold leaf).

1491 deaths
15th-century Italian painters
Italian male painters
Painters from Tuscany
1421 births